The Belarus women's national under-20 volleyball team represents Belarus in international women's volleyball competitions and friendly matches under the age 20 and it is ruled and managed by the Volleyball Federation Of The Rep. Of Belarus (BVF) That is an affiliate of Federation of International Volleyball FIVB and also a part of European Volleyball Confederation CEV.
In light of the 2022 Russian invasion of Ukraine, the European Volleyball Confederation (CEV) banned all Belarusian national teams, clubs, and officials from participating in European competition, and suspended all members of Belarus from their respective functions in CEV organs.

Results

FIVB U20 World Championship
 Champions   Runners up   Third place   Fourth place

Europe U19 Championship
 Champions   Runners up   Third place   Fourth place

Team

Previous squad
The following is the Belarus roster in the 2021 FIVB Volleyball Women's U20 World Championship.

Head coach:  Volha Palcheuskaya

1 Liubou Svetnik 
3 Anastasija Svetnik 
4 Dziyana Vaskouskaya 
5 Kseniya Liabiodkina 
6 Viktoryia Kastsiuchyk 
7 Hanna Karabinovich 
8 Valeryia Turchyna 
9 Darya Sauchuk 
10 Anastasiya Shahun 
11 Lizaveta Bahayeva 
12 Darya Borys 
14 Darya Vakulka 
16 Darya Burak 
17 Marharyta Zakharanka 
27 Emilia Mikanovich

References

External links
Official website

National women's under-20 volleyball teams
Volleyball
Volleyball in Belarus